Kericho Gold is a premium tea brand in Kenya launched in 2002. It is a brand of Gold Crown Beverages (K) Ltd, a subsidiary of Global Tea & Commodities (K) Ltd, one of the largest exporters of Black Tea in Kenya.

Formats 
Kericho Gold is packed in loose leaf tea bags, string & tag tea bags, enveloped tea bags and tagless round tea bags.

Blends 
Blends range from black teas, green teas, fruit and herb infusions.

Tea variants/products
 Black tea
 Speciality teas
 Health and wellness
 Attitude tea
 Luxury pyramid teas

References

External links
Official Brand website
 Gold Crown's Beverages Website
  Gold Crown Foods Website

Distribution partners 
 South Africa loveTEAtime website
 North America Asilia USA/ Asilia Inc. (www.kerichogold.ca)

Kenyan brands
Tea brands
Tea companies of Kenya
Kenyan companies established in 2002
Food and drink companies established in 2002